Rossella Fiamingo (born 14 July 1991) is an Italian left-handed épée fencer and two-time individual world champion. A three-time Olympian, Fiamingo is a 2021 team Olympic bronze medalist and 2016 individual Olympic silver medalist. 

She is engaged to the swimmer Olympic gold medal Gregorio Paltrinieri.

Career
Fiamingo did ballet and rhythmic gymnastics as a child. She took up fencing when she was seven at the instigation of her father, who already drove her brother to a nearby fencing school, AS Methodos Catania. She was taught by Gianni Sperlinga, who remains her personal coach as of today. In 2004, she was selected into the cadet Italian national team. She won the 2007 Cadet European Championships in Novi Sad, then the 2008 Cadet World Championships at home, in Acireale. She earned both the individual and team gold medals in 2009 and 2010 at the Junior European Championships, then she won the 2010 European U23 Championships in Gdańsk.

Fiamingo joined the national senior team in the 2010–11 season. At the 2011 European Championships in Sheffield she reached the quarter-finals, where she was defeated by teammate Nathalie Moellhausen. The next season she climbed her first World Cup podium with a bronze medal in Doha, followed by a gold medal in Rio de Janeiro. Qualified to the 2012 Summer Olympics with the team, she was defeated 14–15 in the quarter-finals of the individual event by China's Sun Yujie. In the team event, Italy were defeated in the first round by the United States, then lost to Romania in the ranking matches and finished seventh.

In the 2013–14 season Fiamingo won the World Championships, defeating along the way Olympic champions Yana Shemyakina and Britta Heidemann. Rossella Fiamingo (ITA) won again women's individual épée at the 2015 world championships in Moscow to become the first woman to win back-to-back world titles in this event since Laura Flessel-Colovic (FRA) in 1998–1999. Fiamingo joined Flessel-Colovic (1998 and 1999) and Mariann Horvath (HUN, 1991 and 1992) as the only women with multiple world titles in this event. This was the third gold medal for Italy in this event, equalling France and Hungary on most wins. She in the 2014–2015 season also won the world cup.
Fiamingo has a degree in pianoforte and studies nutrition at the University of Catania.

She won the silver medal in the women's épée event at the 2022 European Fencing Championships held in Antalya, Turkey. She won one of the bronze medals in the women's épée event at the 2022 World Fencing Championships held in Cairo, Egypt.

Medal Record

Olympic Games

World Championship

European Championship

Grand Prix

World Cup

References

External links

Italian female épée fencers
Living people
Olympic fencers of Italy
Fencers at the 2012 Summer Olympics
Fencers at the 2016 Summer Olympics
1991 births
Medalists at the 2016 Summer Olympics
Olympic silver medalists for Italy
Olympic medalists in fencing
Sportspeople from Catania
Mediterranean Games gold medalists for Italy
Mediterranean Games medalists in fencing
Competitors at the 2013 Mediterranean Games
Fencers of Centro Sportivo Carabinieri
Fencers at the 2020 Summer Olympics
Medalists at the 2020 Summer Olympics
Olympic bronze medalists for Italy
20th-century Italian women
21st-century Italian women
World Fencing Championships medalists